Mark David Chapman (born 1960) is a British Anglican priest, theologian, historian, and academic. He has been Vice-Principal of Ripon College Cuddesdon since 2002, and Full Professor of the History of Modern Theology at the University of Oxford since 2015.

Early life and education
Born in 1960, Mark David Chapman was brought up in Essex and Berkshire. He studied Politics and Philosophy at Trinity College, Oxford, graduating in 1983 with a Master of Arts degree; he completed a Doctor of Philosophy degree there in 1989.

Career
Chapman became a Stephenson Research Fellow at the University of Sheffield in 1989. In 1992, he joined the staff at Ripon College, Cuddesdon. Since 2002, he has been Vice-Principal of Ripon College, Cuddesdon. In 2015, he was appointed Professor of the History of Modern Theology by the University of Oxford. As of 2016, Chapman is a visiting professor at Oxford Brookes University, and is course director for the Oxford undergraduate degree programme in theology.

Having trained for ordination on the Oxford Ministry Course, Chapman was ordained in the Church of England as a deacon in 1994 and as a priest in 1995. Between 1994 and 1999, he was non-stipendiary minister in Dorchester and then, from 1999 to 2014, he took up an equivalent post at Wheatley and, since 2014, at Garsington, Cuddesdon and Horspath. He is also Canon Theologian of Truro Cathedral and a member of the General Synod.

Selected works
Chapman has researched the history of Christian theology, especially modern doctrine, the history of Anglicanism, liberal theology and Christianity in America. He has also written about the history of Christianity at Cuddesdon. 

His published works include:

 Anglicanism: A Very Short Introduction ("Very Short Introductions" [#149]. Oxford University Press, 2006).
 Doing God: Religion and Public Policy in Brown's Britain (Darton, Longman and Todd, 2008)
 "7th September: Proper 18", Expository Times, vol. 119, issue 11 (2008), pp. 545–546
 "7th December: 2nd Advent", Expository Times, vol. 120, issue 2 (2008), pp. 79–80
 "Theological Responses in England to the South African War, 1899–1902", Journal for the History of Modern Theology, vol. 16, issue 2 (2009), pp. 181–196
 "Newman and the Anglican Idea of a University", Journal for the History of Modern Theology, vol. 18, issue 2 (2009), pp. 212–227
 "Rowan Williams's Political Theology: Multiculturalism and Interactive Pluralism", Journal of Anglican Studies, vol. 9, issue 1 (2011)
 "George Tyrrell and Catholic Modernism", Journal of Theological Studies, vol. 62 (2011), pp. 405–407
 "Red Toryism: Some Historical Reflections", Political Theology, vol. 13, issue 3 (2012), pp. 277–291
 Anglican Theology (T. & T. Clark, 2012)
 with Woodhead, L., Naquib, S., "God-Change" in Religion And Change In Modern Britain (Routledge, 2012), pp. 173–195
 "Ernst Troeltsch: Kierkegaard, compromise and dialectical theology" in Stewart, J. (ed.), Kierkegaard Research: Sources, Reception and Resources, Tome I (Ashgate Publishing, 2012), pp. 377–392
 "The Oxford Movement, Jerusalem and the Eastern Question", in Brown, S. J., Nockles, P. B. (eds.), The Oxford Movement (Cambridge University Press, 2012), pp. 221–235
 "American Catholicity and the National Church: The Legacy of William Reed Huntington", Sewanee Theological Review (2013)
 The Fantasy of Reunion: Anglicans, Catholics, and Ecumenism, 1833–1880 (Oxford University Press, 2014)
 Theology and Society in Three Cities: Berlin, Oxford and Chicago, 1800–1914 (Cambridge: James Clarke, 2014)

References 

1960 births
Academics of the University of Oxford
British Christian theologians
Alumni of Trinity College, Oxford
Living people
20th-century English Anglican priests
21st-century English Anglican priests